"The Way You Are" is a pop song that was recorded by Agnetha Fältskog and Ola Håkansson of the band Secret Service in 1986. The song was used to promote Falun, Sweden as a candidate for hosting the 1992 Olympic Winter Games. Falun was not selected to host the Games, but the song became a big hit in Sweden.

The song on the B-side, "Fly Like the Eagle", was also a duet by Fältskog and Håkansson. Both songs were featured in the documentary It's Time for Sweden.

The single reached No. 1 in Sweden, but was not successful in the rest of the world. Though outside Sweden, The Way You Are received extensive airplay by  FM stations at least in Brazil, during the 1987-89 period, as it can still be seen by the numerous blogs and websites in that country displaying either translations or links to direct streaming of that song.

Song versions

Track listings
7" vinyl
 "The Way You Are" (4:10)
 "Fly Like the Eagle" (3:06)

12" vinyl
 "The Way You Are" (Extended Version) (6:32)
 "The Way You Are" (Instrumental Version) (4:07)
 "The Way You Are" (7" Version) (4:07)

Chart trajectories

References

1986 singles
Agnetha Fältskog songs
Number-one singles in Sweden
Songs written by Alexander Bard
Songs written by Tim Norell
Songs written by Ola Håkansson
English-language Swedish songs
Male–female vocal duets
1986 songs